Shape Expressions (ShEx)  is a data modelling language for validating and describing a Resource Description Framework (RDF).

It was proposed at the 2012 RDF Validation Workshop as a high-level, concise language for RDF validation.

The shapes can be defined in a human-friendly compact syntax called ShExC or using any RDF serialization formats like JSON-LD or Turtle.

ShEx expressions can be used both to describe RDF and to automatically check the conformance of RDF data. 
The syntax of ShEx is similar to Turtle and SPARQL while the semantics is inspired by regular expression languages like RelaxNG.

Example

PREFIX :       <http://example.org/>
PREFIX schema: <http://schema.org/>
PREFIX xsd:  <http://www.w3.org/2001/XMLSchema#>

:Person {
 schema:name  xsd:string   ;
 schema:knows @:Person   * ;
}

The previous example declares that nodes conforming to shape Person must have one property schema:name with a string value and zero or more properties schema:knows whose values must conform with shape Person.

Implementations

 shex.js: JavaScript
 shaclex: Scala library with support for Jena (framework) and RDF4J
 PyShEx: Python
 shexjava: Java
 Ruby ShEx: Ruby
 ShEx.ex: Elixir

Online playgrounds and demos 
 ShExSimple: Online demo based on shex.js
 rdfshape: online demo based on shaclex

References

Further reading
 Specification

See also
 SHACL
Wikidata
 XML schemas

Resource Description Framework
Data modeling languages
Declarative programming languages
RDF data access
Semantic Web
World Wide Web Consortium standards
SPARQL